Jack Condy (born 1 December 1994) is a former Welsh rugby union player who last played for the Scarlets as a Number 8.

Professional career 
In 2015, Condy signed for the Scarlets, having turned down the Dragons, despite playing for partner club Cross Keys RFC.

On 26 February 2018, Condy announced that after problems with a knee injury, he would be retiring from rugby. He made 19 appearances for the Scarlets, and featured 23 times for Llanelli RFC.

After his retirement, Condy began coaching with his former youth club Penallta RFC. Condy later joined the Dragons Academy as management, coaching the U18 team.

References

External links 
Scarlets Player Profile

1994 births
Living people
People from Aberbargoed
Rugby union players from Caerphilly County Borough
Scarlets players
Welsh rugby union players
Rugby union number eights